The United States Virgin Islands women's national volleyball team represents the United States Virgin Islands in international women's volleyball competitions and friendly matches.

They compete at the NORCECA World Championship Qualification Tournament.

References

External links
United States Virgin Islands Volleyball Federation

Videos
 Mexico vs. US Virgin Islands - 2014 FIVB World Championships Qualifiers YouTube.com video

National women's volleyball teams
Volleyball
Volleyball in the United States Virgin Islands
Women's sports in the United States Virgin Islands